William Wylie may refer to:
 William Campbell Wylie (1905–1992), New Zealand-born Chief Justice of Borneo
 W. Derek Wylie (1918–1998), British physician, dean of the Royal College of Anaesthetists
 William Duncan Wylie (1900–1981), Canadian politician, farmer, public servant and federal 
 William Howie Wylie (1833–1891), Scottish journalist and Baptist minister
 William M. Wylie (1928–2006), U.S. politician, farmer, and businessman from Nebraska

See also
 Bill Martin (songwriter) (1938–2020), Scottish songwriter, real name William Wylie MacPherson
 William Wylie Galt (1919–1944), United States Army officer and  Medal of Honor recipient